Hellenic Film Academy Awards or Hellenic Iris Awards are a set of awards given annually by the Hellenic Film Academy for excellence of cinematic achievements in Greek cinema, replacing the abolished Greek State Film Awards. On May 3, 2010 the first awards ceremony was presented at the Athens Concert Hall. Since 2016 the awards renamed to Iris Awards.

Hellenic Film Awards

Best Film

Best Director

Best First Film Director

Best Screenwriter

Best Actor

Best Actress

Best Supporting Actor

Best Supporting Actress

Best Cinematography

Best Music

Best Editing

Best Production Design / Art Direction

Best Costume Design

Best Sound

Best Make-up

Best Special & Visual Effects

Best Documentary Film

Best Short Film

Honorary Award

See also
Greek Film Critics Association Awards
Greek State Film Awards
Thessaloniki International Film Festival

References

External links
Hellenic Film Academy, The awards
Hellenic Film Academy at IMDB.

2010 establishments in Greece
Annual events in Athens
Awards established in 2010
Greek film awards
Recurring events established in 2010
Film festivals in Greece